The Sugartone Brass Band, assembled in 2002, is a New Orleans-style second line brass band based in New York City.

The band has played in New York's Village Halloween Parade since 2004.  In 2004 they played for the inaugural induction ceremonies for the Coney Island Hall of Fame.  In 2006, they were the house band for the New York Burlesque Festival. They were the featured musicians at the 2006 James Beard Foundation Awards.  From 2005 to 2006 they had a weekly residency at Jacques-Imo's Café in New Orleans.  They have appeared on MTV's "Making the Band."

The first Sugartone Brass Band album, Live from Brooklyn, was released in January 2008.  The band appeared on MTV’s Making the Band in March 2009.

History
The band was assembled in 2002 with six members, and expanded to eight in 2004.

American brass bands
American jazz ensembles from New York City